The Roman Catholic Diocese of Techiman is a diocese located in the city of Techiman in the Ecclesiastical province of Kumasi in Ghana.

History
 December 28, 2007: Established as the Diocese of Techiman from the Diocese of Sunyani and Diocese of Konongo–Mampong

Leadership
 Bishops of Techiman (Roman rite)
 Bishop Dominic Nyarko Yeboah (December 28, 2007 – present)

References
 GCatholic.org
 Catholic Hierarchy

Roman Catholic dioceses in Ghana
Dioceses in Ghana
Christian organizations established in 2007
Roman Catholic dioceses and prelatures established in the 21st century
Roman Catholic Ecclesiastical Province of Kumasi